The Consort Islands are two small islands in Marguerite Bay, lying  northeast of Emperor Island in the Dion Islands. The Dion Islands were first sighted and roughly charted in 1909 by the French Antarctic Expedition. The Consort Islands were surveyed in 1948 by the Falkland Islands Dependencies Survey and so named by the UK Antarctic Place-Names Committee because of their association with Emperor Island.

See also 
 List of Antarctic and sub-Antarctic islands

References 

Islands of Graham Land
Fallières Coast